Franz Schubert (original German title: Franz Schubert – Ein Leben in zwei Sätzen) is a 1953 Austrian film depicting composer Franz Schubert's life and work.

It was shot at the Rosenhügel Studios in Vienna with sets designed by the art director Leo Metzenbauer.

Plot 
Franz Schubert works as an assistant teacher in the school led by his father.  In his spare time, however, the young man, who considers Ludwig van Beethoven to be his unattainable role model, devotes himself to writing music. As public acceptance is denied to him, his friends lobby at the music publisher Anton Diabelli for a public performance of Schubert's music. During a reception, at which Schubert performs his Ave Maria, he gets to know singer Therese Grob.

Schubert decides to quit the employment at his father's and, instead, to concentrate merely on music, and moves in his with friends, poets Franz von Schober and Moritz von Schwind and painter Johann Mayerhofer. There, he is inspired to set Johann Wolfgang von Goethes ballad Der Erlkönig to music.

Schubert friends encourage him to play his music in public. Schubert and Therese, who sings his songs, are made one. The two make a living with performing Schuberts songs. Schubert, though, develops doubts, whether he can express himself in songs appropriately, and so decides to turn to writing symphonies and operas. As Schubert applies for the position of a Vice Director of Music, Therese hands over to the Secretary of the Court Theatre Schuberts latest work, the Unfinished Symphony. Disagreements arise during the rehearsals for Schubert's latest opera, as the singer of the leading part considers the music too difficult to sing. Music publishers Tobias Haslinger and Anton Diabelli reject his music. Even his very promising application as a Vice Director of Music proves to be unsuccessful.

Thus, depressed Schubert decides to tour his songs in order to make a living. In this period of time, he writes the Winterreise.

After having returned, Schubert decides to have lessons in counterpoint with Beethoven, but shies away from contacting his idol. Shortly later, while being plagued by health problems, Schubert gets a visit from Beethoven's secretary Anton Schindler. Sickly Beethoven sends some Goethe poems to Schubert to be set in music, as Beethoven regards Schubert to be the better song composer.

As Schubert wants to visit Beethoven, he arrives too late: Beethoven has died. Schubert is one of the torchbearers during Beethoven's funeral. Suffering from more and more serious health problems, Schubert is no longer able to perceive the success of a public performance of his music. He dies one year after his idol.

Cast 
Heinrich Schweiger: Franz Schubert
Aglaja Schmid: Therese Grob
Hans Thimig: Father Schubert
Karl Bosse: Heinrich Grob
Maria Eis: Madame Schechner
Rolf Wanka: Franz Schober
Louis Soldan: Moritz von Schwind
Michael Janisch: Bergmann
Anni Korin: Netty
Erwin Strahl: Johann Mayerhofer
Karl Mittner: Ferdinand Schubert
Fritz Hinz-Fabricius: Court opera singer Vogl
Richard Eybner: Secretary of the Court theatre
Chariklia Baxevanos: Young girl
Fritz Imhoff: 
Senta Wengraf
Fred Hennings
Otto Treßler
Franz Pfaudler
Alma Seidler
Susanne Engelhart
Karl Ehmann
Marianne Gerzner
Franz Herterich
Gisa Wurm

External links 
 

1953 films
1950s biographical drama films
Austrian biographical drama films
1950s German-language films
Biographical films about musicians
Films about classical music and musicians
Films directed by Walter Kolm-Veltée
Films shot in Vienna
Films set in Vienna
Films set in the 1810s
Films set in the 1820s
Film
Films about composers
1950s historical drama films
Austrian historical drama films
Films shot at Rosenhügel Studios